William Dressler may refer to:
 William F. Dressler (fl. 1917), businessman and Nevada state senator
 William Dressler (cardiologist) (1890–1969)
 William Dressler (anthropologist) (born 1951)

See also
 Willy Oskar Dressler (1876–1954), German writer on art and interior decoration